Janta Congress Chhattisgarh (or Chhattisgarh Janata Congress) is a political party in the Indian state of Chhattisgarh. The party was founded by former Chief Minister, Ajit Jogi, after Jogi and his son Amit were expelled from Indian National Congress due to anti-party activities as well as sabotaging a bypoll election in Antagarh. Amit Jogi was expelled for six years.

Ajit Jogi launched the party in Thathapur village of Kawardha district and directly challenged Chief Minister of Chhattisgarh Raman Singh.

Chhattisgarh Assembly Election 2018
The JCC and BSP decided to fight in the 2018 Chhattisgarh Legislative Assembly election in alliance with each other according to which, JCC  contested on 55 seats while BSP  contested on 35 seats. The alliance declared Ajit Jogi as its Chief Ministerial candidate. Later, the CPI also gave support to this alliance. The alliance strongly condemns the policies of both the main parties in the state, the BJP and INC and gives a new platform to the people of Chhattisgarh in the form of a third front. Ajit Jogi released the manifesto on stamp paper and said, "I am ready to go to the jail if the promises remain unfulfilled". However the alliance was badly defeated as it could manage to win only 7 seats out of the 90 seats in which JCC won 5 seats & its alliance partner BSP won 2 seats.

References

See also
Indian National Congress breakaway parties
:Category:Janta Congress Chhattisgarh politicians

2016 establishments in Chhattisgarh
Political parties established in 2016
Political parties in Chhattisgarh
Indian National Congress breakaway groups